Amherst is a city in Lamb County, Texas, United States. The population was 721 at the 2010 census.

History
Amherst, on U.S. Route 84 and the BNSF Railway in west central Lamb County, began in 1913 as a Pecos and Northern Texas Railway station for William E. Halsell's Mashed O Ranch. A townsite was platted a mile from the Santa Fe depot in 1923 and named for Amherst College by a railroad official. The post office opened in 1924. By 1930 thirty-five businesses and 964 people constituted a lively trade center, and amenities included a newspaper, the Amherst Argus. For many years the Amherst Hotel, the town's first permanent building, was the most popular stopping place between Clovis, New Mexico and Lubbock, Texas. The population in Amherst was 749 in 1940, when the first co-op hospital in Texas was built there. Incorporation came in 1970, when the population was 825. In 1980 the population was 971, and businesses included five cotton gins and two grain elevators.

Geography 
U.S. Route 84 passes just southwest of Amherst, connecting Littlefield and Muleshoe.

Climate 
According to the Köppen Climate Classification system, Amherst has a semi-arid climate, abbreviated "BSk" on climate maps.

Demographics

As of the census of 2000, there were 791 people, 269 households, and 210 families residing in the city. The population density was 951.4 people per square mile (368.0/km2). There were 341 housing units at an average density of 410.2 per square mile (158.6/km2). The racial makeup of the city was 68.90% White, 9.36% African American, 0.25% Native American, 21.11% from other races, and 0.38% from two or more races. Hispanic or Latino of any race were 39.95% of the population.

There were 269 households, out of which 36.1% had children under the age of 18 living with them, 62.1% were married couples living together, 11.5% had a female householder with no husband present, and 21.6% were non-families. 20.1% of all households were made up of individuals, and 10.8% had someone living alone who was 65 years of age or older. The average household size was 2.83 and the average family size was 3.25.

In the city, the population was spread out, with 31.2% under the age of 18, 7.5% from 18 to 24, 24.3% from 25 to 44, 18.1% from 45 to 64, and 19.0% who were 65 years of age or older. The median age was 34 years. For every 100 females, there were 87.0 males. For every 100 females age 18 and over, there were 83.8 males.

The median income for a household in the city was $24,276, and the median income for a family was $25,714. Males had a median income of $22,625 versus $19,063 for females. The per capita income for the city was $9,911. About 25.0% of families and 31.7% of the population were below the poverty line, including 45.8% of those under age 18 and 8.4% of those age 65 or over.

Education
The city is served by the Amherst Independent School District.

Notable people

 Booga Bradshaw Grew up in Amherst in the early 1990s. He is known as one of the most influential recording artists in the 806 (West Texas) area
 Dan Hewitt Owens, actor; born in Amherst in 1947
 Gary Painter, sheriff of Midland County, who warned in 2014 about ISIS terrorism, was born in Amherst in 1947

See also
Earth, Texas
Plant X
Yellow House Draw

References

External links

Cities in Texas
Cities in Lamb County, Texas